Brent Rivera (born January 9, 1998) is an American social media personality and actor who first gained popularity on the now-defunct video hosting service Vine. He has large followings on Instagram, TikTok, and YouTube.

Early and personal life
Brent Rivera was born on January 9, 1998, in Huntington Beach, California to John Rivera, a firefighter, and Laura Rivera, a teacher. He has three siblings. His sister Lexi is also a social media personality and appeared with him in the webseries Brobot. Rivera attended Huntington Beach High School, where he played varsity ice hockey.

Career
Rivera is the co-founder and CEO of Amp Studios, a talent incubator and content group that in 2020 generated 10 billion social media views each month. His business partner is Matt Levine, who is also his manager. Their goal is to tap into media monetization and become "a Disney Channel for the digital generation." He also has a clothing line called Relatable and started a pop culture-centric podcast called So Relatable in 2021. In 2015, he participated in Coca-Cola's #MakeItHappy campaign and worked with Hollister Co. in 2019 on their anti-bullying campaign.

Filmography

Web roles

Television

Awards and nominations

References

External links
 
 

1998 births
21st-century American male actors
American male child actors
American male web series actors
American TikTokers
American YouTubers
Comedy YouTubers
Hispanic and Latino American male actors
Living people
People from Huntington Beach, California
Vine (service) celebrities
YouTube vloggers

Streamy Award winners